Lokomotiv Stadium is a multi-use stadium in Atkarskaya Street, Saratov, Russia.  It is currently used mostly for football matches.  The stadium holds 15,000 people.

References

External links
Lokomotiv Stadium (Saratov) at DestiMap

Sports venues built in the Soviet Union
Football venues in Russia
FC Sokol Saratov
Buildings and structures in Saratov Oblast